Joseba Beitia Agirregomezcorta (born 29 September 1990) is a Spanish footballer who plays as an attacking midfielder for Indian Super League club NorthEast United FC.

Club career
In November 2020, Beitia signed with I-League club RoundGlass Punjab.

In November 2022, Beitia was part of Rajasthan United team that reached final of Baji Rout Cup in Odisha, and clinched title later, defeating Churchill Brothers.

Career statistics

Club

Honours
Mohun Bagan
I-League: 2019–20

Rajasthan United
Baji Rout Cup: 2022

References

External links

1990 births
Living people
Spanish footballers
Footballers from San Sebastián
Association football midfielders
Segunda División B players
Tercera División players
Real Sociedad B footballers
CD Sariñena players
UD Somozas players
Marbella FC players
Racing de Ferrol footballers
Real Unión footballers
I-League players
Mohun Bagan AC players
Spanish expatriate sportspeople in India
Expatriate footballers in India